General theory may refer to:

Generalized theory of gravitation
General theory of relativity
General systems theory
Generalized cohomology theory
The General Theory of Employment, Interest and Money, a 1936 book written by John Maynard Keynes